Michael Hui Koon-man (born ; 3 September 1942) (also known as Mr Boo!) is a Hong Kong actor, comedian, scriptwriter and director. He is the eldest of the four Hui brothers (together with Ricky, Sam, and Stanley) who were prominent figures in the Hong Kong entertainment industry during the 1970s and the 1980s.  Michael Hui is considered by many critics to be one of the foremost comedians in the Hong Kong film industry.

Education
Hui studied in La Salle College, and then earned a degree in sociology from the United College, the Chinese University of Hong Kong.

Career 
After a spell hosting quiz shows on TVB, Hui gained popularity in the Hong Kong entertainment industry with his variety show stints in the Hui Brothers Show.  He then moved from television to film.  Hui's first work was in a film by Taiwanese director Li Han-hsiang called The Warlord (大軍閥  or "The Great Regime", 1972), where he played a farcical warlord in post-revolutionary China.

In 1974, he set up his own film company, the Hui Film Company, with Golden Harvest, with his brothers Ricky and Sam.  Between 1974 and 2000 he created more than 20 comedy films, 5 of them were Hong Kong's No. 1 box-office hit of the year.

The earliest Hui comedies combined episodic gags with the comedic appeal of Michael and his brothers.  This usually involved the trio of actors—Michael, Sam and Ricky—pitting their wits against the odds to earn quick bucks and their livelihood.  Set in modern-day Hong Kong, with upbeat soundtracks performed by Sam himself, these works became wildly popular amongst the working classes in the 1970s and early 1980s. Games Gamblers Play (1974), The Private Eyes (1976), The Contract (1978) and Security Unlimited (1981) – the last of which won him the first Hong Kong Film Award for Best Actor – are often seen as the quintessential comedies made by the company.  Games Gamblers Play was a huge success when first released and paved the way for Cantonese movies to hold their own against the colonial trend of Mandarin production.

In the 1980s, Hui developed a new brand of satirical comedy, one which capitalized on his deadpan comic timing, using a more character-driven storyline. Some of his more renowned works came during this period in the 1980s. Hui frequently acted out the archetypal "ne'er-do-well" driven on by a cash-mad Hong Kong society. Equally caustic and funny, they are set against the backdrop of present-day Hong Kong consumerism. He would make a rare North American film appearance as the Subaru mechanic/engineer with Jackie Chan in the Burt Reynolds comedy The Cannonball Run. In Chocolate Inspector (1986), he plays a chocolate-eating inspector who must solve a kidnap case while his subordinate is involved in a Miss Hong-Kong pageant. In Chicken and Duck Talk (1988), opposing restaurateurs come to blows to secure profits. Front Page (1990), which reunited the three brothers, lampoons the Hong Kong press, while The Magic Touch (1992) satirizes the Chinese obsession with fortune-telling and wealth. Always on my Mind (1993) continues in this vein of self-deprecating humour: Hui plays the head of a family, a news anchor, who will stop at nothing to grab money.

Hui continued acting and producing his own comedies, at a less prolific rate, in the 1990s and 2000s. He wrote a dozen screenplays, but none were produced because he felt dissatisfied. Chinese Box (1997), directed by Wayne Wang, remains Hui's only starring film in the West. He played a talented safe-cracker, who kidnaped a baby for money from triads but was kind-hearted and dignified, in the action-comedy Rob-B-Hood (2006), starring alongside Jackie Chan and Louis Koo. In 2006, he became the host of the quiz show Deal or No Deal. In 2016, he starred in the Taiwanese black comedy film, Godspeed, for which he is nominated the Golden Horse Award for Best Leading Actor.

Organized by the Hong Kong Arts Development Council (HKADC), the 15th Hong Kong Arts Development Awards was held on Oct 30, 2021.  Hui was one of the recipients of the Award for Outstanding Contribution in Arts, for his active involvements in filmmaking as a director, a screenwriter and actor.

Filmography

Acting roles

Films directed, written or produced

Accolades
In 2022, Hui received the Lifetime Achievement Award at 40th Hong Kong Film Awards for his cinematic achievements in the comedy genre.

See also

 Cinema of Hong Kong

References

External links

 
Interview At FarEastFilms.com

1942 births
Living people
Hong Kong male film actors
Hong Kong male comedians
Hong Kong film directors
Hong Kong screenwriters
Hong Kong film producers
People from Panyu District
Male actors from Guangzhou
Writers from Guangzhou
20th-century Hong Kong male actors
21st-century Hong Kong male actors
Alumni of the Chinese University of Hong Kong
New Hong Kong Alliance politicians
Members of the Selection Committee of Hong Kong
Chinese University of Hong Kong people
Screenwriters from Guangdong